This is the second season of the WEC series. It include the French Formula Renault championship rewarding the best French driver (F) and reward also the Rookies driver (R).

 Point system : 15, 12, 10, 8, 6, 5, 4, 3, 2, 1 for 10th. In each race 1 point for Fastest lap and 1 for Pole position.
 Races : 2 race by rounds (first between 60 and 80 km, second between 20 and 30 minutes).

References

Renault
Formula Renault seasons